Pooja Shri Shetty (born 10 August 1990) is an Indian karateka and an Aerospace engineer competing in the kumite 61 kg division.

Early life 
Pooja Shri Shetty was born on 10 August 1990, in a Tulu speaking bunt family in Kaup, Udupi. She completed her schooling from Little Rock Indian School and graduated with Bachelor's degree in Aerospace engineering from Amity University, Noida followed by a Master's degree in Aerospace Propulsion from Cranfield University, UK.

Achievements
Pooja started training in karate from a tender age of 6 and was selected to represent India in the World Karate Championship 2000 in Germany. She has represented India in several WKF Karate Series A tournaments and International Championships. Her Tokyo Olympics 2020 standing is 181.

References 

Indian female karateka
Sportspeople from Karnataka
Sportspeople from Mangalore
Sportswomen from Karnataka
People from Udupi district
1990 births
Living people
Indian female martial artists
21st-century Indian women
Tulu people